UDP glucuronosyltransferase 1 family, polypeptide A cluster (UGT1A) is a human gene locus which includes several UDP glucuronosyltransferases.

The UGT1A locus includes thirteen unique alternate first exons followed by four common exons. Four of the alternate first exons are considered pseudogenes. Each of the remaining nine 5' exons may be spliced to the four common exons, resulting in nine proteins with different N-termini and identical C-termini. Each first exon encodes the substrate binding site, and is regulated by its own promoter.

References

Further reading

Gene clusters